A by-election was held in the Cook Islands constituency of Tengatangi-Areora-Ngatiarua on 18 March 2019. The by-election was called following the defection of sitting MP Te-Hani Brown from the Democratic Party in January in order to support the government of Henry Puna, which triggered a by-election under election law. Brown ran as an independent with the support of the Cook Islands Party against Nandi Glassie, whom Brown had beaten in the 2018 Cook Islands general election.

Results

Aftermath
Although Brown retained her seat, Glassie filed a petition against her victory. He alleged that she had effectively bribed voters by covering the charge of a private aircraft to carry voters to vote on Atiu; Brown maintained that this did not constitute an offence. Brown resigned in April 2019 during the process of the petition through the courts and although Glassie was allowed to challenge the election result, this was reversed on appeal. Brown's seat was declared vacant in September 2019, triggering another by-election.

References

By-elections in the Cook Islands
Tengatangi-Areora-Ngatiarua by-election
Tengatangi-Areora-Ngatiarua by-election
March 2019 events in Oceania